Giancarlo Pedote is an Italian professional sailor born on 26 December 1975 in Florence (Italy).

Biography
At the age of 14 he discovered windsurfing, then moved onto dinghy sailing starting in Hobie 16 catamaran he was also heavily into boxing. In 2001, he graduated in philosophy from the University of Florence. He is an instructor in windsurfing, dinghy sailing and catamaran sailing before he moved into offshore sailing.

Results
Reference

References

External links
 Vendee Campaign Website

1975 births
Living people
Sportspeople from Florence
Italian male sailors (sport)
Class 40 class sailors
IMOCA 60 class sailors
Italian Vendee Globe sailors
2020 Vendee Globe sailors
Vendée Globe finishers
Single-handed circumnavigating sailors